The Landesanstalt für Umwelt, Messungen und Naturschutz Baden-Württemberg (LUBW) or Baden-Württemberg State Institute for the Environment, Survey and Nature Conservation is a central institution of the German federated state of Baden-Württemberg, whose legal responsibilities lie in the fields of  environmental conservation, health and safety and consumer protection and thus they support the state authorities at a technical level in nature conservation and radiation protection.

The head office of the LUBW is in Karlsruhe; in 2015 it had 550 employees and an annual budget of €65 M.

External links 
 lubw.baden-wuerttemberg.de

References 

Environmental organisations based in Germany
Organisations based in Baden-Württemberg
Karlsruhe
Culture of Baden-Württemberg
2006 establishments in Germany
Government of Baden-Württemberg